Sri Aurobindo Vidyamandir is an all-boys English medium school in Hatkhola, Chandannagar, West Bengal, India established in 1973.

Alumni
Sabyasachi Mukherjee
 Ritabrata Munshi
 Ishan Porel

See also
Education in India
List of schools in India
Education in West Bengal

References

External links

Boys' schools in India
Schools in Hooghly district
Chandannagar
Educational institutions established in 1973
1973 establishments in West Bengal
Schools affiliated with the Sri Aurobindo Ashram